Sangin High School is a public high school located in Dalseo-gu, Daegu, South Korea. It was established in 2001.

References

External links
 Official website

High schools in Daegu
Educational institutions established in 2001
2001 establishments in South Korea